Laches may refer to:
 Laches (equity), an equitable principle in Anglo-American law
 Laches (general) (c. 475 – 418 BC), an Athenian aristocrat
 Laches (dialogue), a Socratic dialogue of Plato
 Laches, Bogotá, a neighbourhood (barrio) in Bogotá, Colombia
 Laches, the Lache people

See also
 Lache (disambiguation)
 Lachesis (mythology), the Fate who determined the length of the thread of life
 Lachesis (genus), the bushmaster pit viper
 Lachesis or 120 Lachesis, C-type asteroid between Mars and Jupiter